European Senior Masters can refer to either of two European Senior Tour golf tournaments.

Farmfoods European Senior Masters, first played in 2017
Travis Perkins Masters, called the Bovis Lend Lease European Senior Masters from 2002 to 2005 and the European Senior Masters in 2006 and 2007